Daniël van Kaam (born 23 June 2000) is a Dutch professional footballer who plays as a midfielder for Eredivisie club Cambuur.

Club career
Van Kaam is a product of FC Groningen's youth academy, and signed his first professional contract on 26 June 2017. He made his professional debut with Groningen in a 1–0 Eredivisie loss to ADO Den Haag on 6 October 2018.

On 31 August 2022, van Kaam signed a three-year contract with Cambuur.

International career
Van Kaam is a youth international for the Netherlands.

Personal life
Van Kaam was born in the Netherlands to a Dutch father and Brazilian mother. Van Kaam is the older brother of Joël van Kaam.

References

External links
 
 Ons Oranje U17 Profile
 Ons Oranje U19 Profile
 

2000 births
Living people
Dutch people of Brazilian descent
People from Appingedam
Dutch footballers
Association football midfielders
Netherlands youth international footballers
Netherlands under-21 international footballers
FC Groningen players
SC Cambuur players
Eredivisie players
Derde Divisie players
Footballers from Groningen (province)